Zhiduo may refer to:

Zhiduo (clothing), traditional Chinese attire (hanfu) for men
Zhiduo County, in Qinghai, China